Warrior's Dance Festival was a one-day electronic music and rock music festival curated by The Prodigy.

History
In 2009 the first festival was held in Tokyo, Japan. The lineup included The Prodigy, Pendulum, Hadouken!, MSTRKRFT, AutoKratz and South Central.  In 2010 it moved to Milton Keynes Bowl in England, U.K. Headlined by The Prodigy, the event was held over two stages with mainstage performances from Pendulum, Chase & Status, Does It Offend You, Yeah?, Enter Shikari, Doorly, Zane Lowe and Eddy Temple Morris. The second stage was headlined by Gallows with Lethal Bizzle, David Rodigan, Caspa and Hounds.

The third festival was held at Kalemegdan Fortress in Belgrade, Serbia on 15 September 2012. The line up included The Prodigy, Skrillex, Feed Me, Caspa, Zane Lowe, Serbian bands Ritam Nereda, Goblini, Lollobrigida and Eyesburn.

In 2013, the festival took place at the Exit Festival in Novi Sad, Serbia on Friday 12 July. The Prodigy, GBH (band), DJ Fresh, Feed Me, Prototypes, Brookes Brothers, Eyesburn,  and South Central.

See also

List of electronic music festivals
Live electronic music

References

External links
WarriorsDanceFestival.com

Music festivals established in 2009
Music festivals staged internationally
Music festivals in Japan
Music festivals in Buckinghamshire
Music festivals in Serbia
Electronic music festivals in Japan
Electronic music festivals in the United Kingdom
Electronic music festivals in Serbia
Rock festivals in Japan
Rock festivals in the United Kingdom
Rock festivals in Serbia